Lyubimovka is a rural locality (a village) in Petropavlovsky Selsoviet, Askinsky District, Bashkortostan, Russia. The population was 19 as of 2010. There are 2 streets.

Geography 
Lyubimovka is located 5 km west of Askino (the district's administrative centre) by road. Askino is the nearest rural locality.

References 

Rural localities in Askinsky District